Government Inter College Noida is a Hindi Medium Intermediate School in Noida in the Gautam Budh Nagar district of Uttar Pradesh, India. The school is affiliated to U.P. Board,  offering Arts Stream & Science Stream courses to their students.

Location
This Inter College Located in Sector-12 Noida, Nearest Metro Stations Are Noida City Centre metro station and Noida Sector 16 metro station. Other transit are available to reach there like e-rickshaw, bus, auto-rickshaw etc. Noida Stadium is about 300 meters from this school. It is one of best Inter College in Noida.

References

Schools in Noida
Intermediate colleges in Uttar Pradesh